Khemais Labidi (born 30 August 1950) is a Tunisian football manager and retired footballer who played as a midfielder. He was most recently the manager of Ivorian club San Pédro. He represented the Tunisia national football team in the 1978 FIFA World Cup. He also played for Tunisian club Jeunesse Sportive Kairouanaise and Saudi club Al-Wehda. He later also coached the Tunisian Olympic side at the 2004 Summer Olympics.

References

External links
FIFA profile

1950 births
Tunisian footballers
Tunisia international footballers
Tunisian expatriate footballers
Association football midfielders
1978 FIFA World Cup players
1978 African Cup of Nations players
Living people
JS Kairouan players
Al-Wehda Club (Mecca) players
Tunisian Ligue Professionnelle 1 players
Saudi Professional League players
Expatriate footballers in Saudi Arabia
Tunisian expatriate sportspeople in Saudi Arabia
Tunisian football managers
JS Kairouan managers
CS Hammam-Lif managers
Najran SC managers
Tunisian Ligue Professionnelle 1 managers
Saudi Professional League managers
Tunisian expatriate football managers
Expatriate football managers in Saudi Arabia
Expatriate football managers in Ivory Coast